San Agustín is a municipality in the Usulután department of El Salvador.

References

Municipalities of the Usulután Department